Vete-Katten (meaning “The wheat cat” in Swedish) is a classic Sweden pastry- and coffeeshop.

History
Ester Nordhammar founded it in 20 Jan 1928. She had 42 years of experience in pastry and typical cakes. This coffeeshop is well known as a Scandinavian and Sweden cake shop where the people can get typical cakes and sweets.

Agneta, Osten Brolin and master pastry chef Johan Sandelin bought Vete Katten in 1979. There are other smaller branch offices in Stockholm in Ahlens, Stockholm Central Station, the Karolinska hospital, and the Continental hotel and gallery.

Vete Katten was awarded by the Gourmet Merit (pour la Merite Gastronomique).

Between 2003 and 2005 the coffeeshop published a recipe book containing its main jams, loaves of bread, and the princess cake with a green layer.

During a long period of time the workers of the coffeeshop were only women both in the front as back of the counter, unusual in those years.

References

Restaurants established in 1928
Swedish culture
Swedish cuisine